The vice-voivode of Transylvania was the deputy of the voivode of Transylvania in the Kingdom of Hungary. The office first appeared in contemporary sources in 1221. From the early 15th century, the voivodes rarely visited Transylvania, permanently leaving the administration of the counties to the vice-voivodes, who often belonged to their voivodes' allegiance. They held some judicial powers

History

List of vice-voivodes

See also
Voivode of Transylvania

References

Sources 

Medieval Transylvania